Symphony No. 48 may refer to:

 Symphony No. 48 (Haydn)
 Symphony, K. 111+120 (Mozart)
 Symphony, K. 98 (Mozart)

048